Lars Helle (born 1 November 1962) is a Norwegian journalist and editor.

He was chief editor of Rogalands Avis from 1996 to 2000. He was then hired in Dagbladet, and held various mid-level leadership positions. When Thor Gjermund Eriksen withdrew in March 2006, Helle became acting chief editor. He stepped down in August the same year when Anne Aasheim was hired as the new editor. He held the position as ethics editor under Aasheim. In January 2010, Aasheim resigned and Helle became acting editor again.

In May 2010 the position was made permanent. He resigned in the autumn of 2011 to become editor-in-chief of Stavanger Aftenblad.

He is married to journalist Hilde Torgersen.

References

1962 births
Living people
Norwegian newspaper editors
Dagbladet people